Pozarica  was a  cargo ship that was built in 1945 as Hermes by NV Scheepswerke Gebroeders Pot, Bolnes, South Holland, Netherlands for the Koninklijke Nederlandsche Stoomboot Maatschappij. She was seized by the British in an incomplete state in May 1945. She was passed to the Ministry of War Transport (MoWT) and renamed Empire Dove. The ship was completed during 1946. She was sold into merchant service in 1949 and renamed Pozarica in 1953. In 1964, she was sold to Spain and renamed Blue Fin. On 27 November 1965, she lost her rudder in a storm in the Bay of Biscay. Although the ship was taken under tow, her cargo shifted the next day and she sank.

Description
The ship was built in 1945 by NV Scheepswerke Gebroeders Pot, Bolnes.

The ship was propelled by a diesel engine.

History
The ship was laid down in 1940. Intended to be named Hermes for the Koninklijke Nederlandsche Stoomboot Maatschappij, she was seized in May 1945 in an incomplete state. In 1949 the ship was completed in Germany as Empire Dove. She was operated under the management of MacAndrews & Co Ltd, London, being sold to them in 1949. Empire Dove was renamed Pozarica in 1953. On 3 July 1957, Pozarica had to be fumigated as her cargo of Spanish onions was infested with Colorado beetles.

In 1964, Pozarica was sold to Sociedad Anónima Letas, Spain. On 27 November 1965, she lost her rudder in a storm in the Bay of Biscay.

References

1945 ships
Ships built in the Netherlands
Empire ships
Ministry of War Transport ships
Steamships of the United Kingdom
Merchant ships of the United Kingdom
Steamships of Spain
Merchant ships of Spain
Maritime incidents in 1965